The Giro della Provincia di Lucca was a professional road bicycle race held annually in Province of Lucca, Italy held between 1999 and 2006. From 2005, the race was organized as a 1.1 event on the UCI Europe Tour, previously being a stage race.

Winners

External links
Official site

References

UCI Europe Tour races
Cycle races in Italy
Recurring sporting events established in 1999
1999 establishments in Italy
Defunct cycling races in Italy
Recurring sporting events disestablished in 2006
2006 disestablishments in Italy